This is a list of awards from Bhojpuri cinema.

List
Bhojpuri Film Awards
Sabrang Film Awards
International Bhojpuri Film Awards

See also
List of Bhojpuri films

References

Bhojpuri cinema
Lists of films by language